The Eye of the Buddha (German: Das Auge des Buddha) is a 1919 Austrian silent film directed by Maurice Armand Mondet and starring Fritz Kortner, Franz Herterich and Nelly Hochwald.

Cast
 Fritz Kortner as indischer Diener 
 Franz Herterich
 Nelly Hochwald
 Grete Lundt
 Leopold Kramer

References

Bibliography
 Bock, Hans-Michael & Bergfelder, Tim. The Concise CineGraph. Encyclopedia of German Cinema. Berghahn Books, 2009.

External links

1919 films
Austrian silent feature films
Austrian drama films
Austrian black-and-white films
1919 drama films
Silent drama films